Montevideo is a 43-storey,  residential skyscraper on the river Nieuwe Maas in Rotterdam, The Netherlands. The logo is also designed to be a giant wind vane. Designed by Mecanoo architecture firm principal, Francine Houben, the building is one of the tallest woman-designed buildings in the world. The building is named after the Uruguay capital city, Montevideo.

Awards
The building received a commendation award by the International Highrise Award 2006, and it has been awarded the Dedallo Minosse Prize. In addition it finished in third place in the 2005 Emporis Skyscraper Award selection.

Gallery

See also

References

Skyscrapers in Rotterdam
Skyscraper office buildings in the Netherlands
Residential buildings completed in 2005
Residential skyscrapers in the Netherlands
Neomodern architecture
Apartment buildings in the Netherlands
Retail buildings in the Netherlands